Gustavia erythrocarpa is a species of woody plant in the family Lecythidaceae. It is found only in Brazil. It is threatened by habitat loss.

References

erythrocarpa
Endemic flora of Brazil
Flora of Pará
Vulnerable plants
Taxonomy articles created by Polbot